piri (born 1999) is an English dance musician and pornographic content creator.

Piri may refer to:

People

Given name
 Piri Halasz (fl. 1966–2009), American art critic, educator and writer
 Piri Mehmed Pasha (died 1533), Grand Vizier of the Ottoman Empire in 1517
  (born 1962), Hungarian actress
 Piri Poutapu (1905–1975), New Zealand Māori master carver and carpenter
 Piri Reis (c. 1465–c. 1554), Ottoman Empire admiral, geographer and cartographer
 Piri Thomas (1928–2011), writer and poet
 Piri Vaszary (1901–1965), Hungarian film actress
 Piri Weepu (born 1983), New Zealand rugby union footballer

Surname
 Hajji Piri (died 1690s), controller of the assay of the Safavid Empire in the early 1690s
 Kati Piri (born 1979), Hungarian-born Dutch politician and Member of the European Parliament (MEP)
 Mahdi Khajeh Piri (born 1955), founder of Noor International Microfilm Center, New Delhi
 Onurcan Piri (born 1994), Turkish footballer

Places
 Piri, Angola, a town and commune
 Piri Planitia, a geological feature on Pluto
 Piri Rupes, a geological feature on Pluto

Other
 Piri language, a Bantu language of the Democratic Republic of the Congo
 Piri (instrument), Korean woodwind musical instrument

See also
 Piri piri, a cultivar of Capsicum frutescens, one of the sources of chili pepper
 Peri (disambiguation)
 Piri Wiri Tua (disambiguation)
 Pirie (disambiguation)